Boramae Station is a station on Seoul Subway Line 7 and Sillim Line. It is named after a nearby park with the same name. However, Boramae Park is much closer to Sindaebang Station.

Station layout

References

Metro stations in Yeongdeungpo District
Seoul Metropolitan Subway stations
Railway stations opened in 2000